Svetislav "Kari" Pešić (born August 28, 1949) is a Serbian professional basketball coach and former player who is the head coach of the Serbia men's national team.

Playing career
During his club playing career, Pešić played with Pirot (1964–1967), Partizan (1967–1971), and Bosna (1971–1979). As a member of Bosna, he won a Yugoslav Cup and a Yugoslav League championship, in 1978. Also, he won the FIBA European Champions Cup (EuroLeague) championship in 1979 with Bosna.

Coaching career

Club coaching career
On the club level, Pešić won the triple crown in 2003, while he was the head coach of FC Barcelona. On 16 November 2010, he was named the head coach of Power Electronics Valencia, for the rest of the 2010–11 season. In November 2012, Pešić was named the head coach of the German team Bayern Munich. On 28 February 2015, he extended his contract with the club until 2017. On 24 July 2016, he left Bayern at his own request, for health reasons.

On 9 February 2018, he returned to FC Barcelona as the team's head coach, until the end of the season.

National team coaching career
Pešić led the Yugoslavian junior national team, that featured future international stars Vlade Divac, Saša Đorđević, Toni Kukoč, and Dino Rađa, to a gold medal at the 1987 FIBA World Junior Championship (which was later split into separate under-19 and under-21 events), by defeating the Team USA twice during the tournament.

As the head coach of the senior German national basketball team, he won the gold medal at the EuroBasket 1993 (organized by Germany).

With the FR Yugoslavian senior side, Pešić won gold medals at the 2002 FIBA World Championship, which was held in Indianapolis, and the EuroBasket 2001 (organized by Turkey). He stepped down from the position on 1 December 2002.

On 28 September 2021, the Basketball Federation of Serbia hired him as the new head coach for the Serbia men's national team.

Coaching record

EuroLeague

|- 
| align="left" rowspan=3|Barcelona
|- ! style="background:#FDE910;"
| align="left" |2002–03
|21||17||4||||Won EuroLeague Championship
|- 
| align="left" |2003–04
|20||14||6|||| align="center" |Eliminated at Top 16 Stage
|- 
| align="left" |Valencia
| align="left" |2010–11
|20||11||9|||| align="center" |Eliminated at Top 16 Stage
|- 
| align="left" rowspan=3|Bayern
| align="left" |2013–14
|24||9||15|||| align="center" |Eliminated at Top 16 stage
|- 
| align="left" |2014–15
|10||2||8|||| align="center" |Eliminated at the group stage
|- 
| align="left" |2015–16
|10||4||6|||| align="center" |Eliminated at the group stage
|- 
| align="left" rowspan=3|Barcelona
| align="left"|2017–18
|8||4||4|||| align="center" |Eliminated in regular season
|- 
| align="left" |2018–19
|35||20||15|||| align="center" |Eliminated in quarterfinals
|- 
| align="left" |2019–20
|28||22||6|||| align="center" |Season cancelled
|- 
|-class="sortbottom"
| align="center" colspan=2|Career||176||103||73||||

Personal life
Along with Serbian, Pešić also possesses German citizenship. His son, Marko (born 1976), is a former professional basketball player, and was an occasional member of the senior German national team. Former German basketball player Jan Jagla, is his son-in-law, due to his marriage with Pešić's daughter, Ivana.

See also 
 List of EuroLeague-winning head coaches
 List of FIBA EuroBasket winning head coaches
 FIBA Basketball World Cup winning head coaches

References

External links

 Svetislav Pešić at euroleague.net
 Svetislav Pešić at acb.com 
 Svetislav Pešić at beko-bbl.de 

1949 births
Living people
Shooting guards
EuroLeague-winning coaches
FIBA EuroBasket-winning coaches
FIBA Hall of Fame inductees
German basketball coaches
German men's basketball players
German expatriate basketball people in Serbia
German people of Serbian descent
KK Bosna Royal players
KK Partizan players
KK Pirot players
KK Bosna Royal coaches
KK Crvena zvezda head coaches
FC Barcelona Bàsquet coaches
RheinStars Köln coaches
FC Bayern Munich basketball coaches
Alba Berlin basketball coaches
BC Dynamo Moscow coaches
Liga ACB head coaches
Pallacanestro Virtus Roma coaches
Recipients of the Order of Merit of Berlin
Serbia national basketball team coaches
Serbia and Montenegro national basketball team coaches
People from Pirot
Naturalized citizens of Germany
Serbian expatriate basketball people in Germany
Serbian expatriate basketball people in Italy
Serbian expatriate basketball people in Russia
Serbian expatriate basketball people in Spain
Serbian men's basketball coaches
Valencia Basket coaches
Yugoslav basketball coaches
Yugoslav emigrants to Germany
Yugoslav men's basketball players